Tonna chinensis, common name : the China tun, is a species of large sea snail, a marine gastropod mollusk in the family Tonnidae, the tun shells.

Description
The size of an adult shell varies between 40 mm and 140 mm.

Distribution
This species occurs in the Indo-West Pacific.

References

 Beu, A. G. (2005) Neogene fossil tonnoidean gastropods of Indonesia. Scripta Geologica 130, p. 1-186, pp. 166, figs. 327
 Vos C. (2005) Notes on Tonnidae of the T. variegata complex and T. chinensis complex, with descriptions of four new species (Gastropoda: Tonnidae). Visaya 1(5): 45-62. [November 2005]
 Vos, C. (2007). A conchological Iconography (No. 13) - The family Tonnidae. 123 pp., 30 numb. plus 41 (1 col.) un-numb. text-figs, 33 maps., 63 col. pls, Conchbooks, Germany
 Vos, C. (2008) Tonnidae. in Poppe G.T. (ed.) Philippine Marine Mollusks, Volume 1: Gastropoda 1: 594-611, pls 242-250. Conchbooks, Hackenheim, Germany
 Liu, J.Y. [Ruiyu] (ed.). (2008). Checklist of marine biota of China seas. China Science Press. 1267 pp.
 Vos, C. (2012) Overview of the Tonnidae (MOLLUSCA: GASTROPODA) in Chinese waters. Shell Discoveries 1(1); pp. 12-22; Pls. 1-9
 Vos, C. (2013) Overview of the Tonnidae (Mollusca: Gastropoda) in Chinese waters. Gloria Maris 52(1-2); pp. 22-53; Pls. 1-9

External links
 Gastropods.com : Tonna (Chinensis complex) chinensis; accessed : 26 April 2011
 Dillwyn, 1817. Dillwyn, L. W. (1817). A descriptive catalogue of Recent shells, arranged according to the Linnean method; with particular attention to the synonymy. London: John and Arthur Arch. Vol. 1: 1-580; Vol. 2: 581-1092 + index
 Mörch, O. A. L. (1852-1853). Catalogus conchyliorum quae reliquit D. Alphonso d'Aguirra & Gadea Comes de Yoldi, Regis Daniae Cubiculariorum Princeps, Ordinis Dannebrogici in Prima Classe & Ordinis Caroli Tertii Eques. Fasc. 1, Cephalophora, 170 pp. (1852); Fasc. 2, Acephala, Annulata, Cirripedia, Echinodermata, 74 (+2) pp. (1853). Hafniae [Copenhagen: L. Klein]
 Schepman, H. H. (1893). On a collection of Shells from the Moluccas. Notes from the Leyden Museum. 15: 147-159
 Sowerby, G. B. III. (1904). Descriptions of Dolium magnificum, n. sp., and Murex multispinosus, n. sp. Proceedings of the Malacological Society of London. 4: 7-8
 Bayer C. (1937). Catalogue of the Doliidae in the Rijksmuseum van Natuurlijke Historie. Zoologiscshe Mededelingen. 20(5): 29-50

Tonnidae
Molluscs of the Indian Ocean
Molluscs of the Pacific Ocean
Gastropods described in 1817
Taxa named by Lewis Weston Dillwyn